Michael A. Hoey  (1934 – 17 August 2014) was a British author and film and television writer, director, and producer. He was the son of Dennis Hoey, who played Inspector Lestrade in Universal's Sherlock Holmes series.

Film and television 
Hoey began in Hollywood working as an editor. He later was given the opportunity to write, direct and produce a number of feature films, including the teen comedy Palm Springs Weekend, the cult horror flick The Navy vs. the Night Monsters, and two movies starring Elvis Presley . Hoey transitioned to television where he wrote and directed a number of movies and shows, most notably a multi-year run on Fame.

Hoey was elected to membership in the American Cinema Editors.

Writing 
Hoey extensively discussed his father Dennis Hoey's early life, career, marriages and death, as well as his own experiences working in film in his 2007 book Elvis, Sherlock and Me: How I Survived Growing Up in Hollywood.  He also wrote about his experiences working on the TV series Fame in his 2010 book Inside Fame on Television: A Behind the Scenes History. In his third book Sherlock Holmes and the Fabulous Faces: The Universal Pictures Repertory Company (2011) he discussed the lives and careers of the many character actors and actresses who supported Basil Rathbone and Nigel Bruce in the 12 Holmes films made at Universal between 1942 and 1946.

Personal life 
He was a widower living in San Clemente, California, when he died on August 17, 2014. He was 79.

Selected filmography
 The Legend of Mandinga (1961), Writer / Director
 Palm Springs Weekend (1963), Producer
 The Navy vs. the Night Monsters (1966), Writer / Director
 Live a Little, Love a Little (1968), Screenplay
 Stay Away, Joe (1968), Screenplay

References

External links
  Archive of Hoey's personal website.
 

1934 births
2014 deaths
British directors
British writers
American Cinema Editors
Male actors from London
People from San Clemente, California